Fernand Voussure (24 July 1918 – 16 August 2003) was a Belgian footballer. He played in one match for the Belgium national football team in 1944.

References

External links
 

1918 births
2003 deaths
Belgian footballers
Belgium international footballers
Place of birth missing
Association football forwards